Prsten is a village in the municipality of Valandovo, North Macedonia.

Demographics
As of the 2021 census, Prsten had 30 residents with the following ethnic composition:
Turks 29
Albanians 1

According to the 2002 census, the village had a total of 68 inhabitants. Ethnic groups in the village include:
Turks 68

References

External links

Villages in Valandovo Municipality
Turkish communities in North Macedonia